Colliuris is a genus of ground beetles in the family Carabidae. There are more than 90 described species in Colliuris.

Species
These 99 species belong to the genus Colliuris:

 Colliuris academica Liebke, 1933
 Colliuris aenea Laporte, 1835
 Colliuris affinis (Chaudoir, 1863)
 Colliuris amoena (Chaudoir, 1863)
 Colliuris arrowi Liebke, 1930
 Colliuris batesii (Chaudoir, 1863)
 Colliuris bierigi Liebke, 1932
 Colliuris bivittis (Chaudoir, 1872)
 Colliuris brevipennis (Chaudoir, 1863)
 Colliuris bruchi Liebke, 1936
 Colliuris bucephala Liebke, 1930
 Colliuris canoae Liebke, 1933
 Colliuris caymanensis Darlington, 1947
 Colliuris championi (Bates, 1883)
 Colliuris corrusca (Chaudoir, 1863)
 Colliuris cosciniodera (Chaudoir, 1852)
 Colliuris crispa Klug, 1834
 Colliuris crispella Liebke, 1930
 Colliuris cuyabana Liebke, 1930
 Colliuris cyanea Liebke, 1930
 Colliuris cyanella Liebke, 1930
 Colliuris cyanescens (Chaudoir, 1863)
 Colliuris demerarae Liebke, 1930
 Colliuris elegans (Guérin-Méneville, 1855)
 Colliuris ellipticeps Liebke, 1930
 Colliuris elongata (Fabricius, 1801)
 Colliuris emdeni Liebke, 1930
 Colliuris excellens Liebke, 1930
 Colliuris flavicornis Brullé, 1834
 Colliuris flavipes (Chaudoir, 1850)
 Colliuris funckii (Putzeys, 1845)
 Colliuris fusca (Reiche, 1842)
 Colliuris geniculata (Gory, 1833)
 Colliuris gestroi Liebke, 1930
 Colliuris gibba (Chaudoir, 1863)
 Colliuris gratiosa Liebke, 1930
 Colliuris gundlachi Darlington, 1934
 Colliuris horni Liebke, 1930
 Colliuris hubenthali Liebke, 1930
 Colliuris humboldti Liebke, 1930
 Colliuris immaculipennis Liebke, 1930
 Colliuris inaequalis (Dejean & Boisduval, 1829)
 Colliuris irregularis (Bates, 1883)
 Colliuris kuntzeni Liebke, 1930
 Colliuris laeviceps Liebke, 1930
 Colliuris lagoenicollis Liebke, 1930
 Colliuris lengi (Schaeffer, 1910)
 Colliuris leprieurii Laporte, 1835
 Colliuris lineolata (Bates, 1884)
 Colliuris liodiscus (Chaudoir, 1872)
 Colliuris lioptera (Bates, 1891)
 Colliuris longipennis (Chaudoir, 1863)
 Colliuris ludoviciana (Sallé, 1849)
 Colliuris lugubris Liebke, 1930
 Colliuris maculipennis Liebke, 1930
 Colliuris marginestriata (Putzeys, 1845)
 Colliuris marmorata (Chaudoir, 1863)
 Colliuris multifoveata Liebke, 1930
 Colliuris noah Darlington, 1934
 Colliuris oglobini Liebke, 1938
 Colliuris olivacea (Chaudoir, 1863)
 Colliuris pensylvanica (Linnaeus, 1758)
 Colliuris peruana (Erichson, 1847)
 Colliuris pilatei (Chaudoir, 1848)
 Colliuris plicaticollis (Reiche, 1842)
 Colliuris portoricensis Liebke, 1930
 Colliuris puberula Liebke, 1930
 Colliuris pubescens (Chaudoir, 1863)
 Colliuris punctatostriata (Chaudoir, 1872)
 Colliuris puncticollis (Chaudoir, 1863)
 Colliuris quadrimaculata (Gory, 1833)
 Colliuris quadrisignata Laporte, 1832
 Colliuris quadrispinosa (Chaudoir, 1863)
 Colliuris robusta Liebke, 1930
 Colliuris rudis (Chaudoir, 1872)
 Colliuris rufipes (Dejean, 1825)
 Colliuris rugicollis (Dejean, 1825)
 Colliuris santarema (Chaudoir, 1872)
 Colliuris signata (Chaudoir, 1872)
 Colliuris sipolisi Oberthür, 1884
 Colliuris spinigera (Chaudoir, 1863)
 Colliuris strandi Liebke, 1938
 Colliuris strasseni (Liebke, 1927)
 Colliuris subdistincta (Chaudoir, 1863)
 Colliuris subtilis (R.F.Sahlberg, 1847)
 Colliuris sulcicauda (Bates, 1883)
 Colliuris sulcicollis (Bates, 1891)
 Colliuris surinamensis (Linnaeus, 1758)
 Colliuris tetrastigma (Chaudoir, 1863)
 Colliuris trimaculata Liebke, 1930
 Colliuris tripustulata (Chaudoir, 1863)
 Colliuris tristigma (Bates, 1883)
 Colliuris tubulifera (Bates, 1878)
 Colliuris umbrigera (Chaudoir, 1872)
 Colliuris variabilis Liebke, 1930
 Colliuris varicornis Perty, 1830
 Colliuris variolosa (Chaudoir, 1863)
 Colliuris vianai Liebke, 1938
 Colliuris viridicollis (Chaudoir, 1863)

References

External links

 

Harpalinae